is a single by Not Yet.

References

2011 singles
Japanese-language songs
Not Yet (band) songs
Nippon Columbia singles